Heineken Cup 2012 may refer to:

 2011–12 Heineken Cup competition
 2012–13 Heineken Cup competition
 2012 Heineken Cup Final, the final of the 2011–12 Heineken Cup competition